William Park may refer to:

William Hallock Park (1863–1939), American bacteriologist and laboratory director
William A. Park (1853–1924), lawyer and political figure in New Brunswick
William W. Park (born 1947), professor of law at Boston University School of Law
Rev. William Park, chairman (2007–09) of the creationist Caleb Foundation
William Park (footballer) (1919–2016), English professional footballer

See also
Bill Park (born 1952), Canadian swimming coach and swimmer
William Parke (disambiguation)
Willie Park (disambiguation)

William Parks (disambiguation)